Jörg Jüttner (born 16 September 1941) is a German sprinter. He competed in the men's 400 metres at the 1964 Summer Olympics.

References

External links
 

1941 births
Living people
Athletes (track and field) at the 1964 Summer Olympics
German male sprinters
Olympic athletes of the United Team of Germany
Place of birth missing (living people)